Bayhorse is a ghost town in Custer County, Idaho, United States, founded in 1877.  After a new gold mine failed, silver was discovered in the area and a mine was started.  Bayhorse was originally established by the silver mine.

In 1976, the entire community was added to the National Register of Historic Places.  The town property was purchased by the state in 2006 and opened to the public in 2009 as part of the Land of the Yankee Fork State Park.

Remains
You can walk along the main dirt street and see several preserved ruins of houses and mining equipment. Also intact are charcoal kilns used to make charcoal to smelt the ore from the mines.

References

External links

Land of the Yankee Fork State Park
Bay Horse and Clayton, Idaho State Historical Society Reference Series

Populated places established in 1877
Populated places in Custer County, Idaho
Ghost towns in Idaho
Protected areas of Custer County, Idaho
National Register of Historic Places in Custer County, Idaho
Populated places on the National Register of Historic Places in Idaho
1877 establishments in Idaho Territory